Council for Education in World Citizenship (CEWC) may refer to:
 CEWC (England), an educational charity in England
 CEWC-Cymru, its counterpart in Wales
 CEWC Northern Ireland, another sister body

Educational charities based in the United Kingdom